HMS Surprise was a Royal Navy R-class destroyer constructed and then operational in the First World War. She was sunk, with most of her crew in 1917. On 23 December 1917 HMS Surprise, and  sank after entering an Imperial German minefield.

Construction
Surprise was ordered from Yarrow Shipbuilders of Glasgow by the British Admiralty in July 1915 as part of the Sixth War Construction Programme. Surprise was one of 4 Yarrow R-class  destroyers ordered as part of this programme, together with 19 Admiralty R-class destroyers and three Thornycroft R-class destroyers. The ship was launched on 25 November 1916 and completed in January 1917. Surprise was built as a Yarrow "special", to Yarrow's own design rather than to the Admiralty's own design for the R-class destroyer. Yarrow's design used direct-drive steam turbines rather than the geared turbines of the Admiralty design, and had two funnels rather than three. As such, they more closely resembled Yarrow M-class Specials,

Three Yarrow boilers fed Parsons turbines, driving two propeller shafts and generating . Armament consisted of three QF Mark IV 4 inch (102 mm) guns, with a single 2-pounder (40-mm) "pom-pom" anti-aircraft gun and four 21 inch (533 mm) torpedo tubes. The ship had a crew of 82 officers and men.

Service
She saw service in the war, being assigned to Harwich Force. On the night of 23/24 January 1917, the Harwich Force was ordered to intercept a German destroyer flotilla that was being transferred from Germany to Zeebrugge, with Surprise part of a group of four destroyers (Surprise,  and ) patrolling off the Schouwen Bank. The German destroyers ran into a cruiser division, with the destroyers  and  heavily damaged, but the Germans managed to escape, and passed Surprises group of destroyers unobserved before reaching Zeebrugge. One German straggler,  encountered Starfishs group. An exchange of fire followed, in which S50 was hit several times by British shells, but S50 managed to torpedo Simoom, which later sank, before escaping and returning to Germany. Surprise was one of a group of four light cruisers and nine destroyers patrolling off the Thornton Bank. On 15 July 1917, the Harwich Force sortied to intercept a group of German merchant ships which the Admiralty has learned was due to sail from Rotterdam to Germany. The group of seven merchant ships was intercepted early in the morning of 16 July.

One of the duties of the Harwich Force destroyers was the so-called "Beef Run", convoys to and from The Netherlands. Surprise was part of the escort of a Netherlands-bound convoy on 22 December, when the destroyer  struck a mine and was badly damaged, having to be towed to Harwich by the destroyer . The remainder of the convoy reached the Hook of Holland safely, and the escort waited near the Maas Light Buoy for the return convoy. At about 02:00 hr on 23 December, Surprise,   and  ran into a German minefield, with Torrent striking a German mine. Surprise and Tornado went to rescue Torrents crew, but Torrent set off a second mine and quickly sank. While she was attempting to rescue survivors and recover her boats, Surprise struck a mine and sank, while Tornado was sunk by two mines while trying to rejoin Radiant. Only Radiant was undamaged and picked up the survivors from the three ships. In total, 12 officers and 240 other ranks were killed from the three ships. There were only seven survivors from Surprises crew, including her Captain Commander W.A Thompson, who had been blown overboard but was picked up by one of Surprises boats. 48 of Surprises crew had been killed.

References

Bibliography
 

 

 

World War I destroyers of the United Kingdom
R-class destroyers (1916)
1916 ships